Hugo Toumire (born 5 October 2001) is a French professional racing cyclist, who currently rides for UCI WorldTeam .

Major results
2018
 1st Trophée Louison-Bobet
 Aubel–Thimister–Stavelot
1st  Young rider classification
1st Stage 2a (TTT)
 4th Overall Tour des Portes du Pays d'Othe
1st Stage 2 (TTT)
 6th Chrono des Nations Juniors
 6th Time Trial, National Junior Road Championships
2019
 1st  Overall Course de la Paix Juniors
1st Stage 1
 2nd Time trial, National Junior Road Championships
 2nd Paris–Roubaix Juniors
 2nd GP Général Patton
 4th Chrono des Nations Juniors
 7th Overall SPIE Internationale Juniorendriedaagse
2021
 5th Overall Tour de l'Avenir
 5th Overall Tour de Savoie Mont-Blanc

References

External links

2001 births
Living people
French male cyclists
Sportspeople from Rouen
Cyclists from Normandy